Euryhalocaulis is a Gram-negative, chemoorganotrophic and aerobic genus of bacteria from the family of Maricaulaceae with one known species (Euryhalocaulis caribicus). 
Euryhalocaulis caribicus has been isolated from surface water of the Caribbean Sea.

References

Bacteria genera
Monotypic bacteria genera